Miguel Cotto vs. Ricardo Mayorga, billed as Relentless, was a boxing super welterweight fight for the WBA (Super) super welterweight championship. The bout was held on March 12, 2011, at MGM Grand Garden Arena, in Las Vegas, Nevada, United States. Cotto won the fight via technical knockout in the twelfth round.

Cotto, a three-division world champion, won his 154-pound belt by stopping Yuri Foreman in the ninth round at Yankee Stadium in June 2010. Following the bout, the Puerto Rican pugilist underwent shoulder surgery and took the rest of 2010 off. On the other hand, Mayorga is coming from a ninth round KO win against Michael Walker in December 2010; this was the first time he fought in 27 months, after being knocked out by Shane Mosley in the twelfth round of their September 2008 match.

Background

Miguel Cotto
After the Manny Pacquiao fight, Cotto moved to the light middleweight division. On June 5, 2010, he fought against Israeli undefeated boxer Yuri Foreman at Yankee Stadium in New York City.

Cotto ended up knocking Foreman down with a signature left hook to the body in the ninth round claiming the WBA light middleweight title, his fourth overall in three different weight divisions.

Ricardo Mayorga
Following the bout with Shane Mosley, Mayorga took a period of inactivity. He was scheduled to fight undefeated junior-middleweight prospect Alfredo Angulo on February 14, 2009 on the undercard of Nate Campbell's title defense against Ali Funeka. Mayorga withdrew from the fight, citing injuries to his ribs from the Shane Mosley fight made training very difficult and therefore was unable to make weight. He stated money was not the issue. However, his promoter, Don King, stated that Mayorga pulled out ten days before the bout after his demands for a higher purse were not met.

On December 17, 2010, the Nicaraguan boxer fought Michael Walker and defeated him by TKO in the ninth round, ending a 27 months layoff.

Undercard

Televised
Light Middleweight bout:  Pawel Wolak vs.  Yuri Foreman
Wolak defeated Foreman via technical knockout. The fight was stopped at the end of round six.

Lightweight bout:  Miguel Vazquez vs.  Leonardo Zappavigna
Vazquez defeated Zappavigna via unanimous decision (117-111, 118-110, 118-110)

Heavyweight bout:  Tommy Zbikowski vs.  Richard Bryant
Zbikowski defeated Bryant via technical knockout. The fight was stopped at 1:45 of round one.

Preliminary card
Heavyweight bout:  Éric Molina vs.  Joseph Rabotte
Molina defeats Rabotte via technical knockout. The fight was stopped at 1:38 of the sixth round.
Middleweight bout:  Matvey Korobov vs.  Michael Walker
Korobov defeats Walker via technical knockout. The fight was stopped at 1:31 of the first round.
Lightweight bout:  Juan Gonzalez vs.  Jeremy McLaurin
Gonzalez defeats McLaurin via technical knockout. The fight was stopped at 1:56 of the first round.
Super Bantamweight bout:  Jesus M. Rojas vs.  Isaac Hidalgo
Rojas defeated Hidalgo via unanimous decision (59–55, 58–56, 59–55).

References

External links
Cotto vs. Mayorga Official Fight Card from BoxRec

Boxing matches
2011 in boxing
Boxing in Las Vegas
2011 in sports in Nevada
March 2011 sports events in the United States
MGM Grand Garden Arena